Kishanganj is an assembly constituency in Kishanganj district in the Indian state of Bihar.

Overview
As per Delimitation of Parliamentary and Assembly constituencies Order, 2008, No 54 Kishanganj Assembly constituency is composed of the following: Kishanganj municipality; Motihara Toluka, Singhia Kulamani, Halamala, Taisa gram panchayats of Kishnaganj community development block; and Pothia CD Block. In 2015 Bihar Legislative Assembly election, Kishanganj will be one of the 36 seats to have VVPAT enabled electronic voting machines.

Kishanganj Assembly constituency is part of No 10 Kishanganj (Lok Sabha constituency).

Members of Legislative Assembly 
Following is the list of Members of Legislative Assembly from Kishanganj Assembly Constituency.

^-bypoll

Election results

1977-2010
In the November 2010 state assembly elections, Dr. Mohammad Jawed of Congress won the Kishanganj seat defeating his nearest rival Sweety Singh of BJP. Contests in most years were multi cornered but only winners and runners up are being mentioned. Akhtarul Iman of RJD defeated Sanjeev Kumar Yadav of BJP in October 2005 and February 2005. Taslimuddin of RJD defeated Rajeswar Baid of BJP in 2000. Rafique Alam of Congress defeated Md. Mustaque Munna of JD in 1995. Md. Mustaque Munna of JD defeated Khalilur Rahman of Congress in 1990. Md. Mustaque Munna of LD defeated Md. Usman of Congress in 1985. Md. Mustaque Munna of Janata Party (Secular – Chanara Singh) defeated Rafique Alam of Congress in 1980. Rafique Alam of Congress defeated Badri Narayan Mandal of JP in 1977.

2019 result
As per the voter list of 2019, there are 286240 electorates and 271 polling stations in this constituency. Voter turnout was 64.81% in the 2019 Lok Sabha elections.

2020

References

External links
 

Assembly constituencies of Bihar
Politics of Kishanganj district